Muhammad Azalinullah bin Mohammed Alias (born 19 March 1996) is a Malaysian footballer who plays as a centre-back for Malaysian club Terengganu.

Career statistics

Club

References

External links
 

Living people
1996 births
Malaysian footballers
People from Terengganu
Association football central defenders
Terengganu F.C. II players
Petaling Jaya Rangers F.C. players
Terengganu FC players
Malaysia Super League players
Malaysian people of Malay descent